Daniel Flynn (born 1961) is an English actor.

Biography
Flynn was born in Evesham, Worcestershire, the son of actor Eric Flynn and his wife Fern Warner; the family moved to Bromley, Kent, when he was a baby.  He has a brother and sister; his brother is actor Jerome Flynn.  He also has a half-brother and sister from his father's second marriage; Johnny Flynn is a musician and actor.

Flynn has been acting on television since 1983.  From 2006 until 2009, he played the role of Superintendent John Heaton in the long-running ITV1 police drama The Bill. He had previously had brief parts in The Bill playing a criminal in the episode "The Assassins" on 20 December 1988 and a Mr. Hemming in "Bringing Up Baby" in January 1993. Flynn's other television credits include Goodbye Mr Chips, The Detectives, The Peter Principle, Soldier Soldier, Peak Practice, Murder in Mind, William and Mary, Afterlife, Star Trap, and Island at War. He also starred as 'Ginger' in the motion picture Biggles: Adventures in Time.

Flynn has also worked as a voice actor. He supplied the voice of Pak the Banana in the English version of the Spanish animated series The Fruities and appeared in anime films including Angel Cop, Dark Myth, Cyber City Oedo 808 and both movies of The Heroic Legend of Arslan. He has voiced numerous video games, including Dark Souls, where he played Solaire of Astora, Vamos the Blacksmith and Giant Blacksmith. He was also Alfred in the game Bloodborne.

References

External links

1961 births
Living people
20th-century English male actors
21st-century English male actors
Alumni of RADA
English male television actors
English male voice actors
Male actors from Worcestershire
People from Evesham